Blas Cantó Moreno (born 26 October 1991) is a Spanish singer and songwriter. He rose to prominence as a member of the Spanish band Auryn. In 2017, he embarked on a solo career. His debut studio album Complicado was released in September 2018, the album peaked at number one on the Spanish Albums Chart. He was going to represent  at the Eurovision Song Contest 2020 in Rotterdam, with the song "Universo" but the competition was cancelled because of the COVID-19 pandemic. He represented Spain instead in Eurovision Song Contest 2021 with the song "Voy a quedarme".

Biography

2000–2004: Beginnings 
In 2000, Cantó participated in the children's talent show Veo Veo, at eight-years old. In 2004, he participated in Eurojunior, the national selection process organised by Televisión Española (TVE) to select the Spanish entry for the Junior Eurovision Song Contest 2004. He advanced to the national final with the song "Sentir", but lost to María Isabel, who went on to win the European final with the song "Antes muerta que sencilla".

2009–2016: Auryn 
In 2009, Cantó founded the boy band Auryn together with Álvaro Gango, Carlos Marco, David Lafuente and Dani Fernández. In 2011, the band participated in Destino Eurovisión, the national selection process organised by TVE to select the Spanish entry for the Eurovision Song Contest 2011. The band advanced to the national final's top three, but lost in the televote to Lucía Pérez.

Auryn went on to gain popularity after their appearance on Destino Eurovisión. The band released their first single "Breathe in the Light" later in 2011, as well as their debut album Endless Road, 7058, both reaching the top 10 of the Spanish Singles and Albums Charts respectively. Their follow-up album Anti-Heroes was released in 2013 and went straight to number one on the Spanish Albums Chart and was certified platinum. Their third album Circus Avenue was preceded by the group's first number one single "Puppeteer", and reached number one on the Spanish Albums Chart where it stayed for 5 consecutive weeks, as well as a platinum certification. The band released their fourth album Ghost Town in December 2015, seven months before going on hiatus.

2016–2017: Tu Cara Me Suena
In July 2016, Cantó was announced to join the cast of the fifth season of television show Tu cara me suena of the singing show series Your Face Sounds Familiar, in which celebrity contestants impersonate a different iconic music artist on stage each week. Shortly after, Auryn announced that they were going into hiatus, as various members of the band, including Cantó, were expecting to launch solo projects. The fifth season of Tu cara me suena premiered on Antena 3 on 7 October 2016. In the season finale that took place on 3 March 2017, he was declared the winner with 55% of the televote.

Performances

2017–present: Solo career
After signing to Warner Music Spain, Cantó released his debut solo single "In Your Bed" on 3 March 2017, the same day as the finale of Tu Cara Me Suena.

On 9 March 2018, Cantó released his first solo Spanish-language single, "Él no soy yo". The single went on to achieve a PROMUSICAE platinum certification. Cantó released his debut solo album, titled Complicado, on 14 September 2018, and debuted atop the Spanish Albums Chart.

On 5 October 2019, TVE announced Cantó as the Spanish entrant at the Eurovision Song Contest 2020. He was going to compete with the song "Universo". After the contest was cancelled, TVE announced that Cantó would represent Spain at the Eurovision Song Contest 2021.

On 29 June 2021, following his participation at Eurovision, Cantó released the single "Americana" featuring the Californian band Echosmith. The official video of the single was released the same day on his official YouTube channel. One month later, a lyric video of the song was released, this version as a solo single with lyrics fully in Spanish.

Eurovision Song Contest

2020
On 5 October 2019, TVE announced Cantó as the Spanish entrant at the Eurovision Song Contest 2020. He was going to compete with the song "Universo". After the contest was cancelled due to the coronavirus global pandemic, TVE announced that Cantó would represent Spain at the Eurovision Song Contest 2021.

2021
For the 2021 finals, titled "Destino Eurovisión 2021", he has proposed various songs and two were chosen for the final to be picked from: "Memoria" and "Voy a quedarme". The final was held on 20 February 2021, with "Voy a quedarme" winning and being chosen to represent Spain in the Eurovision Song Contest 2021. In the final on 22 May 2021, he placed 24th out of 26, scoring 6 points.

Discography

Albums

Singles

As lead artist

As featured artist

Promotional singles

Awards and nominations

References

Living people
1991 births
Warner Music Spain artists
People from Murcia
Singers from the Region of Murcia
Eurovision Song Contest entrants of 2020
Eurovision Song Contest entrants of 2021
Eurovision Song Contest entrants for Spain
English-language singers from Spain
Spanish male songwriters
Spanish LGBT singers
Spanish LGBT songwriters
Spanish LGBT actors
LGBT Christians
Bisexual men
Bisexual male actors
Bisexual singers
Bisexual songwriters
Spanish bisexual people
21st-century Spanish male singers
20th-century Spanish LGBT people
21st-century Spanish LGBT people